Romantic may refer to:

Genres and eras
 The Romantic era, an artistic, literary, musical and intellectual movement of the 18th and 19th centuries
 Romantic music, of that era
 Romantic poetry, of that era
 Romanticism in science, of that era
 Romantic chess of that era
 Romance film, a genre

Books
 The Romantic (Sinclair novel), by May Sinclair
 The Romantic (Gowdy novel), by Barbara Gowdy

Films
 The Romantic (film), a 2009 animated film
 The Romantics (film), a 2010 romantic comedy film
 The Romantics (2022 web series), a Netflix documentary series
 Romantic (film), a 2021 Indian Telugu-language romantic film

Music

Classical
 Romantic, Anton Bruckner's 1881 Symphony No. 4
 Romantic, Carlos Chávez's 1953 Symphony No. 4
 Romantic, Howard Hanson's 1930 Symphony No. 2

Popular
 Romantic (album), 1990, by The Human League
 "Romantic" (song), by Karyn White
 The Romantics, an American rock 'n roll band from Detroit
 "Romantics", a song by Tove Lo from the 2017 album Blue Lips

See also
 Romance (love)
 Dr. Romantic, a 2016–2017 South Korean television series
 Dr. Romantic 2, a 2020 South Korean television series
 Romance (disambiguation)
 Romantic comedy (disambiguation)
 Romantic friendship
 Romantic orientation, a person's preferred sex or gender for a romantic partner
 Romantic Symphony (disambiguation)